Shahrabad Rural District is in the Central District of Firuzkuh County, Tehran province, Iran. At the National Census of 2006, its population was 3,785 in 1,079 households. There were 3,738 inhabitants in 1,265 households at the following census of 2011. At the most recent census of 2016, the population of the rural district was 3,975 in 1,448 households. The largest of its 24 villages was Shahrabad, with 822 people.

References 

Firuzkuh County

Rural Districts of Tehran Province

Populated places in Tehran Province

Populated places in Firuzkuh County